Native Peoples Magazine is an American magazine which was started as a 32-page quarterly magazine in 1987. It was sent to the members of The Heard Museum.

History
In 1987, the Heard Museum of Anthropology and Primitive Art, in association with Media Concepts Group Inc., and Native American Communication Career Development Inc. published the premiere issue of Native peoples : the journal of the Heard Museum. The magazine features articles on the arts and lifestyles of Native Americans. Later the frequency of the magazine was made six per a year.

In 2016 Native Peoples Magazine redesigned its logo and content and initiated its digital applications.  The magazine, now serving the consumer periodical market, has an estimated readership of more than 100,000, in 36 countries.

References

Bimonthly magazines published in the United States
Lifestyle magazines published in the United States
Magazines established in 1987
Native American magazines
Quarterly magazines published in the United States